The Laramie Kid is a 1935 American Western film directed by Harry S. Webb and starring Tom Tyler, Alberta Vaughn in her penultimate film and Al Ferguson.

Plot
Tom Talbot has earned a large amount of money in breaking horses. Hoping to double his money he loses it by gambling and returns in shame to his fiance Peggy. Mistakenly thought a bank robber, Tom lets Peggy's father claim the reward. Tom goes to a road gang in order to identify and bring to justice the real bank robbers.

Partial cast
 Tom Tyler as Tom Talbot  
 Alberta Vaughn as Peggy Bland  
 Al Ferguson as Jim Morley  
 Murdock MacQuarrie as Dad Bland  
 George Chesebro as Ed Larkin  
 'Snub' Pollard as Convict Shorty  
 Steve Clark as Sheriff

References

Bibliography
 Pitts, Michael R. Poverty Row Studios, 1929–1940: An Illustrated History of 55 Independent Film Companies, with a Filmography for Each. McFarland & Company, 2005.

External links
 

1935 films
1935 Western (genre) films
1930s English-language films
American Western (genre) films
Films directed by Harry S. Webb
Reliable Pictures films
American black-and-white films
1930s American films